Slavko Obadov (born 12 July 1948 in Zemun) is a Serbian former judoka who competed in the 1972 Summer Olympics, in the 1976 Summer Olympics, and in the 1980 Summer Olympics.

References

1948 births
Living people
Serbian male judoka
Olympic judoka of Yugoslavia
Serbian sambo practitioners
Judoka at the 1972 Summer Olympics
Judoka at the 1976 Summer Olympics
Judoka at the 1980 Summer Olympics
Olympic bronze medalists for Yugoslavia
Olympic medalists in judo
Medalists at the 1976 Summer Olympics